The Municipality of Redfern was a local government area of Sydney, New South Wales, Australia. The small municipality was proclaimed in 1859 as one of the first municipalities proclaimed under the new provisions of the Municipalities Act, 1858, and was centred on the suburbs of Redfern, Eveleigh, Darlington and Surry Hills. The council was amalgamated, along with most of its neighbours, with the City of Sydney to the north with the passing of the Local Government (Areas) Act 1948. From 1968 to 1982 and from 1989 to 2004, the area was part of the South Sydney councils.

Council history
When Redfern Municipality was proclaimed in August 1859, the area initially included the areas of Waterloo and Alexandria. However the Municipality of Waterloo was proclaimed in May 1860 and the Municipality of Alexandria separated from Waterloo in August 1868. Upon incorporation in 1859, the municipality was divided into three wards: Redfern, Waterloo and Surry Hills, each electing three Aldermen. With the secession of Waterloo a few months later the wards were rearranged to be Redfern, Belmore and Surry Hills and in 1880 Golden Grove Ward was added to that number. Under the enactment of The Municipalities Act of 1867, the title of 'Chairman' for the council was changed to be 'Mayor'. With this Act, the council also became known as the Borough of Redfern (From 28 December 1906, with the passing of the Local Government Act, 1906, the council was again renamed as the "Municipality of Redfern"). The Mayor had a set of official robes to wear as part of the office, but they were often boycotted by Labor mayors who affirmed they were against their 'democratic principles'.

Redfern was notable for being the first suburb in Sydney to have electricity and electric street lighting, which occurred when the Council voted unanimously in 1891 to build its own power station, in Turner Street, to power the suburb. From the late 1910s and 1920s the Redfern area became increasingly populated by the unemployed and working class, employed by industry and the nearby Eveleigh Railway Workshops, resulting in the increasing domination of the Labor Party and left-wing groups in the area. In 1947 the Communist Party of Australia succeeded in getting their first alderman, Patrick Levelle, elected to the council. As a consequence the council, traditionally held by the merchant and middle classes, frequently found itself divided on simple matters, including the election of the mayor, which required the Minister for Local Government and the Governor to instead appoint the mayor several times. This was a situation occurring within many of the inner-city councils as demographics of the area changed dramatically, but Redfern was considered the worst example of a council paralysed by party politics.

With the Redfern area's close involvement with the labor movement and the Labor Party, the wartime conscription debate affected Redfern Council most particularly. In October 1916 Redfern Council passed a motion "without a dissentient that conscription was not in the best interests in Australia", in direct opposition to the views of ALP Prime Minister Billy Hughes and the Member for Redfern James McGowen. McGowen lost his preselection in Redfern and in response the Redfern ALP Branch president, Alderman John Leitch (Mayor, 1908–1910, 1914–1915) resigned to join the pro-conscriptionists with his friend McGowen.

By the end of the Second World War, the NSW Government had realised that its ideas of infrastructure expansion could not be effected by the present system of the patchwork of small municipal councils across Sydney and the Minister for Local Government, Joseph Cahill, following the recommendations of the 1945–46 Clancy Royal Commission on Local Government Boundaries, passed a bill in 1948 that abolished a significant number of those councils. Under the Local Government (Areas) Act 1948, Redfern Municipal Council became the Redfern Ward of the City of Sydney, returning two aldermen.

Mayors

Town Clerks

See also
The Hon. Jim Cope CMG, Redfern Alderman (1947–1948), Member of the Australian House of Representatives (MHR) (1955–1975), Speaker of the Australian House of Representatives (1973–1975).
 Phillip Sullivan, Redfern Alderman (1900), ALP Member of the NSW Legislative Assembly for Darlington and Phillip (1901–1907).

References

External links

Redfern Town Hall Honor Roll – Register of War Memorials in NSW (NSW Government)

Redfern
 
Mayors
Redfern
1859 establishments in Australia
1948 disestablishments in Australia